MJR may refer to:

 Manjusri Secondary School, a secondary school in Ubi, Singapore
 Melbourne Jewish Radio
 Mėnuo Juodaragis, Baltic culture festival 
 MJR Digital Cinemas, a movie theater chain in Michigan, United States 
 M. J. Radhakrishnan (died 2019), Indian cinematographer
 Miramar Airport, Argentina (IATA code: MJR)

See also
 Major (military rank), abbreviated as Mjr.